Pelagos is a village in the municipality of Tripoli, Arcadia, Greece. It is situated in the plain of Tripoli, at 670 m above sea level. As of 2011, it had a population of 151. It is 2 km northwest of Zevgolateio and 4 km northeast of Tripoli city centre. The Moreas Motorway (Corinth – Tripoli – Kalamata) passes west of the village. The name Pelagos (meaning "sea") dates from classical antiquity, and refers to an oak forest on the road from Mantineia to Tegea.

Population

See also

List of settlements in Arcadia

References

External links
Pelagos at the GTP Travel Pages
Pelagos at arcadia.ceid.upatras.gr

Populated places in Arcadia, Peloponnese
Arcadian city-states